Daxin ( unless otherwise noted) may refer to these places in China:

Daxin County, in Chongzuo, Guangxi
Daxin Subdistrict (大信街道), Qingdao, Shandong

Towns
Daxin, Fuyang, in Taihe County, Anhui
Daxin, Wuhe County, in Wuhe County, Anhui
Daxin, Guigang, in Pingnan County, Guangxi
Daxin, Henan, in Fugou County, Henan
Daxin, Hubei, in Dawu County, Hubei
Daxin, Hunan, in Xinshao County, Hunan
Daxin, Jiangsu, in Zhangjiagang, Jiangsu
Daxin, Ningxia, in Yinchuan, Ningxia

Other  

Daxin (malware)

See also
Dacin Tigers (達欣), a Taiwanese basketball team
Daxing (disambiguation)